Sitno is a village in Zamość County, Lublin Voivodeship, in eastern Poland. It is the seat of the gmina (administrative district) called Gmina Sitno.

The village has a population of 703.

References

Villages in Zamość County
Lublin Governorate
Kholm Governorate
Lublin Voivodeship (1919–1939)